Cookie Jar TV was an American children's programming block that aired on CBS, originally premiering on September 16, 2006, as the KOL Secret Slumber Party; the block was later rebranded as KEWLopolis on September 15, 2007, and then as Cookie Jar TV on September 19, 2009, running until September 21, 2013. It was originally programmed by DIC Entertainment, which over the course of the block's seven-year run, was acquired by Canada-based Cookie Jar Entertainment and subsequently by DHX Media (both of which thereby assumed responsibility for the lineup). The block was replaced by the CBS Dream Team block on September 28, 2013.

History

KOL Secret Slumber Party

On January 19, 2006, two months after Viacom and CBS Corporation finalized their separation into two commonly controlled companies (both owned by National Amusements), CBS announced that it would enter into a three-year programming partnership with DIC Entertainment to produce a new Saturday morning children's programming block including new and older series from its program library and included the distribution of select tape delayed Formula One auto races.

DIC originally announced that the block would be named CBS's Saturday Morning Secret Slumber Party; however, it was later renamed as the KOL Secret Slumber Party after DIC partnered with KOL, an AOL website aimed at children, to co-produce the block's programming. AOL managed the programming block's website and produced public service announcements which aired both on television and online. This association, along with the fact that some CBS stations chose to tape delay some of the programs to air on Sunday mornings, was what led to the block's renaming. Notably, despite AOL at the time being a sister company to Warner Bros., with whom CBS co-owned the then new CW Network, neither Secret Slumber Party nor Kids' WB advertised each other's programs.

The KOL Secret Slumber Party premiered on September 16, 2006, replacing Nick Jr. on CBS (a block programmed by Nickelodeon, CBS' former sister property under Viacom ownership). Its inaugural lineup included three first-run shows (Horseland, Cake, and Dance Revolution), one show that originally aired on the syndicated DIC Kids Network block (Trollz), and two shows from the 1990s (Madeline and Sabrina: The Animated Series). The block's de facto hosts (and in turn, from whom the Secret Slumber Party name was partly derived) were the Slumber Party Girls, a teen pop female group signed with Geffen Records (consisted of Cassie Scerbo, Mallory Low, Karla Deras, Lina Carattini, and Caroline Scott), who appeared during commercial break bumpers and interstitial segments seen before the start and the end segment of each program as well as serving as the musical performers for one of the series featured in the block, Dance Revolution.

KEWLopolis

In the summer of 2007, KOL withdrew its sponsorship from the network's Saturday morning block. CBS and DIC subsequently announced a new partnership with American Greetings to rebrand the block as KEWLopolis, debuting on September 15 of that year, which would be targeted at younger children and branded as a tie-in with the monthly teen magazine Kewl (which was established in part by DIC in May 2007; it is no longer in publication). All shows were retained from Secret Slumber Party except for Dance Revolution and Madeline. When the rebranded block began, a new series, American Greetings' Care Bears: Adventures in Care-a-lot joined the block along with another fellow DIC/American Greetings series Strawberry Shortcake, which also joined the lineup after having previously been aired in syndication. In November 2007, Sabrina: The Animated Series and Trollz were replaced with two new series, the DIC/American Greetings co-production Sushi Pack and DIC's DinoSquad.

Cookie Jar TV
On June 20, 2008, Canada-based production company Cookie Jar Group announced that it would acquire DIC Entertainment; the purchase was finalized one month later on July 23. On February 24, 2009, CBS renewed its time-lease agreement with Cookie Jar for three additional seasons, running through 2012.

Subsequently, on September 19, the block was rebranded again as Cookie Jar TV; all of the programs from KEWLopolis and KOL Secret Slumber Party were removed upon the block's relaunch. The new shows added to the block were Noonbory and the Super Seven Squirrel Boy and Busytown Mysteries. Sabrina: The Animated Series also returned to the lineup after leaving in 2007.  The theme song for the block was composed by Ron Wasserman. In April 2010, Doodlebops Rockin' Road Show was added, while Strawberry Shortcake returned to the block. 

For the block's second season in September 2010, Noonbory and the Super Seven was replaced with Sabrina's Secret Life and Strawberry Shortcake was removed. In February 2011, Horseland and Trollz were returned, replacing both Sabrina shows.

For the block's third season in September 2011, PBS series Danger Rangers and The Doodlebops were added replacing  Trollz and Doodlebops Rockin' Road Show. The Team Toon name began being used, but only outside of the block, as the Cookie Jar TV brand remained in the block itself.

For the block's fourth and final season in September 2012, Liberty's Kids replaced Danger Rangers and Horseland. The Cookie Jar TV brand remained in place for the block following Cookie Jar Group's acquisition by DHX Media (now WildBrain) in October 2012.

On July 24, 2013, CBS announced a programming agreement with Litton Entertainment (which recently programmed a Saturday morning block that is syndicated to ABC's owned-and-operated stations and affiliates for two years) to launch a new Saturday morning block featuring live-action reality-based series aimed at teenagers ages 13 to 18 years old. Cookie Jar TV ended its run after seven years on September 21, 2013, and was succeeded by the following week on September 28 by the Litton-produced CBS Dream Team.

Programming
All of the programs aired within the block featured content compliant with educational programming requirements as mandated by the Federal Communications Commission via the Children's Television Act. Though the block was intended to air on Saturday mornings, like its predecessors, some CBS affiliates deferred certain programs aired within the block to Sunday mornings, or (in the case of affiliates in the Western United States) Saturday afternoons due to breaking news or severe weather coverage, or regional or select national sports broadcasts (especially in the case of college football and basketball tournaments) scheduled in earlier Saturday timeslots as makegoods to comply with the E/I regulations. Some stations also tape delayed the entire block in order to accommodate local weekend morning newscasts, the Saturday edition of The Early Show and later its successor CBS This Morning or other programs of local interest (such as real estate or lifestyle programs). It was the final children's block to be broadcast only in standard definition.

Former programming

Originated on KOL Secret Slumber Party

Originated on KEWLopolis

Originated on Cookie Jar TV

See also
 Cookie Jar Kids Network
 Cookie Jar Toons

References

External links
 

AOL
Brokered programming
CBS Television Network
Television programming blocks
WildBrain
2006 American television series debuts
2013 American television series endings
Television channels and stations established in 2006
Television channels and stations disestablished in 2013